The Josholu is a river in Alay District, Osh Region, Kyrgyzstan. It is a right tributary of the Kurshab, which it joins near Gulcha.

References

Rivers of Kyrgyzstan